The 2009–10 Liga Profesional de Primera División season, also known as the 2009–10 Copa Uruguaya or the 2009–10 Campeonato Uruguayo, was the 106th season of Uruguay's top-flight football league, and the 79th in which it was professional. The season was named in honor of Héctor del Campo, ex-president of Danubio.

Format
The season was divided into two tournaments: the Apertura and the Clausura. In each tournament, the teams played against each other in a single round-robin format. Whoever plays at home against an opponent in the Apertura played the same opponent as a visitor in the Clausura. The champion of the Copa Uruguaya could have been decided in three ways:

If the same team won both the Apertura and the Clausura.
If two different teams won the Apertura and the Clausura and one of those teams had the most points in the aggregate table, a single playoff match would have been contested between the two clubs. If the winner of the playoff match was the team with the most points in the aggregate table, they would have won the Copa Uruguaya. If not, the same two teams would have contested a two-legged tie, the winner of which would have been decided on points (3 for a win, 1 for a draw, 0 for a loss). If there was a tie in points after the second leg, the team with the best goal difference would be the Copa Uruguaya champion. If there was a tie in points and goal difference after the second leg, 30 minutes of extra time would be played in two 15-minutes halves, followed a penalty shootout if necessary.
If two different teams won the Apertura and the Clausura and neither had the most points in the aggregate table, the Apertura and Clasura winners would play one match (with extra time and a penalty shootout, if needed). The winner of the match would play a maximum of two matches (for points) against the team with the most points in the aggregate table. The team with the most points would be the champion. If there was a tie in points after the second match, goal difference would determine the champion. If there was a tie in points and goal difference after the second leg, 30 minutes of extra time would be played in two 15-minutes halves, followed a penalty shoot-out if necessary.

Relegation
Relegation was determined by an aggregate table of the past two seasons. The teams who had participated only in this season had their points and goal difference multiplied by two. The three lowest-placed teams were relegated to the Segunda División Profesional for the next season.

International qualification
Because of Uruguay's qualification to the 2010 FIFA World Cup, there was no Liguilla Pre-Libertadores this season. The champion of the Copa Uruguaya earned the Uruguay 1 berth in the 2011 Copa Libertadores and 2010 Copa Sudamericana. The Copa Uruguaya runner-up earned the Uruguay 2 berth in the 2011 Copa Libertadores. The Uruguay 3 berth for the 2011 Copa Libertadores went to the highest-placed non-qualified team in the aggregate table. The Uruguay 2 and Uruguay 3 berths for the 2010 Copa Sudamericana went to the next highest-placed non-qualified teams in the aggregate table.

Teams
Sixteen teams competed in the Primera División this season. Thirteen teams remained from the 2008–09 season. Villa Española was relegated last season after the Apertura tournament due to financial reasons. They were joined by Juventud and Bella Vista, who finished 14th and 15th in the relegation table, respectively. These three teams were replaced by Fénix and Cerrito, the 2008–09 Segunda División winner and runner-up, respectively, and Atenas, the Segunda División playoff winner. Both Fénix and Cerrito are returning to the Primera División while this is Atenas' first season in the top-flight.

Torneo Apertura
The Torneo Apertura "Coronel Matías Vázquez" began on August 23, 2009 and ended on December 13, 2009.

Standings

Results

Top-ten goalscorers

Updated as of games played on December 13, 2009.Source: AUF

Torneo Clausura
The Torneo Clausura "Dr. Walter Lanfranco" began on January 23.

Standings

Results

Top-ten goalscorers

Source: AUF

Aggregate table

Season topscorers

Source: AUF

Relegation table

Championship playoffs

Nacional and Peñarol qualified to the championship playoffs as the Apertura and Clausura winners, respectively. Additionally, Peñarol requalified as the team with the most points in the season aggregate table. Given this situation, an initial playoff was held between the two team. Peñarol needed only to win the playoff to become the season champions; Nacional had to win the playoff to force another two matches, which they successfully did.

Finals
Since Nacional won the initial playoff, an additional two matches was contested to crown the champion. The points system was used for the two matches. The team with the most points at the end of the second game was declared the champion. If there was a tie in points after the second game, goal difference would be used to break the tie, followed by two fifteen-minute extra periods, followed by a penalty shootout if necessary.

See also
2009–10 in Uruguayan football

References

External links
Official webpage 
Official regulations 

2009-10
1
Uru
Uru